For a Revolutionary Left (PSR) was a coalition of far-left parties in Italy.

Founded in 2017 to run in the 2018 Italian general election, its leader is Marco Ferrando.

The list has been dissolved in 2022.

Composition

Electoral results

Italian Parliament

References

2017 establishments in Italy
Communist parties in Italy
Far-left politics in Italy
Political parties established in 2017
Political party alliances in Italy
Trotskyist organisations in Italy